Skelmersdale railway station was a station located on the Skelmersdale branch at Skelmersdale, England. The station was originally named Blague Gate, having its name changed to Skelmersdale on 8 August 1874 and carried passengers from 1858 to 1956.

History

The station was one of several built by the East Lancashire Railway on their branch line from Ormskirk to Rainford Junction.  It opened on 1 March 1858, but after a year became part of the Lancashire and Yorkshire Railway system when the ELR was taken over by that company.  The station consisted of two platforms with the main building on the northbound side.  A wooden signal box was provided to control the adjacent level crossing, passing loop and nearby goods yard.  The line towards Ormskirk was subsequently doubled in 1875, the year after the station was renamed.

The service was also generous, with the L&Y running a steam railmotor service of 19 trains per day in each direction from 1906. A similar pattern continued after the route became part of the London, Midland and Scottish Railway in January 1923, but increasing road competition after World War II and the subsequent nationalisation of the railways in 1948 saw traffic levels decline.

The station was closed to passenger traffic by the British Transport Commission on 5 November 1956, with the line south to Rainford closing completely on 16 November 1961 and the rest on 4 November 1963, when goods traffic at the station ceased.  The track was lifted in 1968 and station was demolished soon afterwards; the B5312 road (known as Railway Road) now passes through the site.

Ironically this was done just as the town was undergoing a significant increase in population levels and associated housing development, having been designated as one of the second wave of new towns in 1961 (it was chosen, along with Runcorn as an overspill town for Liverpool).

Reopening proposals

Skelmersdale has been described as the largest town in North-West England that doesn't have a railway station, although Leigh, Greater Manchester, which also has no station is larger. There have been many discussions about reopening a railway station in Skelmersdale. This would require a three-mile rail restoration. In January 2009, the Liverpool Echo newspaper reported that recommendations have been put to councillors to endorse the £60m plan to build a new railway station in Skelmersdale, reconnecting the town with Liverpool.

2009
In June 2009, the Association of Train Operating Companies, in its Expanding Access to the Rail Network report, called for funding for the reopening of this station as part of a £500m scheme to open 33 stations on 14 lines closed in the Beeching Axe, including seven new parkway stations. The route is largely intact, though a deviation north of Westhead would be required. The proposed station would be on the north west corner of town near the Skelmersdale Ring Road, right next to where the old station once was. A feasibility study on the project jointly funded by Merseytravel, Merseyrail, Lancashire County Council & West Lancs Borough Council was due to begin in the autumn of 2013.

2015
Lancashire County Council approved the initiation of a more detailed evaluation on 1 June 2015. This option selection process will take the project to completing Network Rail's GRIP stage 3 level of development in January 2017. The evaluation is to be developed in partnership with Network Rail and Merseytravel. Network Rail has suggested a construction date commencing in April 2021, with services beginning from December 2023, once the single option development and detailed design stages in the GRIP process have been achieved. The likely route for the new link is southwards to join the Kirkby branch line between Upholland and Rainford rather than the original plans to go north via Ormskirk, so as to enable trains to travel to Wigan & Manchester as well as to Liverpool.

2017
In February 2017, Lancashire County Council confirmed that the preferred site for Skelmersdale railway station was the former site of Glenburn Sports College/Westbank Campus. County Council Transport portfolio holder John Fillis said that the site "is big enough to provide a high quality station with scope to expand to meet future demand.". By September, Merseytravel announced that they would be committing £765,000 to the study into the reopening, estimating that the station could be open within a decade with a lot of additional funding. Merseytravel's plan would also see a new station built at Headbolt Lane in Kirkby. It has been proposed a new station at Skelmersdale would act as the terminus for Merseyrail's Northern Line, with connections available to Wigan and Manchester. Initial estimates suggest that the scheme could cost around £300 million to develop.  On page 36 of the Liverpool City Region Combined Authority, Long Term Rail Strategy document of October 2017, it states that Merseytravel is currently working with Lancashire County Council and Network Rail to develop a plan to extend the Merseyrail network from Kirkby through to Skelmersdale, with work completed in 2019. They are considering 3rd rail electrification and other alternatives with a new station at Headbolt Lane to serve the Northwood area of Kirkby. The document on page 37 states two trials of electric 3rd rail/battery trains were planned to be undertaken in 2020, as one of the "alternatives".

2019

Lancashire County Council approved a plan in May 2019 to commission an outline business case into reopening the station which will be presented to the government.

2021

Merseytravel confirmed in March 2021 that talks continue between themselves, Lancashire County Council and other partners about Skelmersdale  railway station, in the context of additional funding being made available about Headbolt Lane railway station further along the Kirkby branch.

On November 2, West Lancashire Borough Council were asked to contribute £43,000 with Lancashire County Council's £245,900 towards the Skelmersdale Regeneration Plan, which would include new shops, the railway station, and other benefits.

2022 
Government reinforces that the station proposals are being considered. Rosie Cooper calls for the new Rail Minister to visit Skelmersdale, in order to aid the DfT's decision.
However, the Department for Transport announced in July 2022 that it was rejecting the Strategic Outline Business Case, throwing the scheme into doubt. The DfT instead suggested that better bus links with the Kirkby–Wigan rail line would be a cheaper way of improving connectivity for Skelmersdale.

References

Sources

External links
 Description via Disused Stations UK
 The coming of the railway
 The station on an old O.S. Map via npemaps

Disused railway stations in the Borough of West Lancashire
Former Lancashire and Yorkshire Railway stations
Railway stations in Great Britain opened in 1858
Railway stations in Great Britain closed in 1956
Proposed railway stations in England
Skelmersdale